The Kelowna Rockets are a major junior ice hockey team based in Kelowna, British Columbia, Canada. The Rockets play in the Western Hockey League (WHL), out of the Canadian Hockey League (CHL). They play their home games at Prospera Place.

The Rockets have won the WHL championship four times and have made it to the Memorial Cup finals three times, winning once. The Rockets captured the Memorial Cup for the first time in franchise history in 2004, the same year they were selected to host the event. The Rockets returned to the Memorial Cup finals in both 2009 and 2015, losing to the Windsor Spitfires in 2009 and the Oshawa Generals in 2015.

Franchise history 
Established in 1991, the team began as the Tacoma Rockets, previously playing in Tacoma, Washington, and playing their home games at the Tacoma Dome. Prior to the 1995–96 season, the team relocated to Kelowna, playing their home games at the city's Memorial Arena. Following the 1998–99 season, they moved into their then-new home arena, Prospera Place. The team's logo pays tribute to the famed Ogopogo monster, of the Okanagan Lake.

1991–94: Early years 

Marcel Comeau was hired to be the first coach of the Rockets, and stayed with the team all four seasons. The 1991–92 season marks the first season of the Rockets in Tacoma, Washington. Playing in one of North America's largest hockey arenas, the Tacoma Dome. The expansion Rockets blasted their way to one of the most memorable inaugural seasons in the 25-year history of the Western Hockey League. Attendance of 14,975 and 15,240 at two heated contests against their then arch rival, the Seattle Thunderbirds. This assisted the Rockets in chalking up the highest per game average for a first year expansion team under the Canadian Hockey League umbrella.

In 1992–93, the Rockets startled everyone in the league by winning 24 straight home games for an all-time Western Hockey League record. Tacoma held first place in the West Division for three months and finished with a promising 45–27–0 season. Head coach Marcel Comeau won the Dunc McCallum Memorial Trophy as the WHL coach of the year, and the CHL Coach of the Year Award as well. In addition to the winning streak, the Rockets' home record of 30–6–0 and collecting 37 more points than the previous year, proved them serious contenders in the WHL. Once again the Rockets' attendance of 13,769 saw them defeat the Seattle Thunderbirds 4–2 in win number 24 and marked the third-largest crowd in the history of the WHL. Three Rockets ultimately won honours as best in the WHL West — goaltender Jeff Calvert as Most Valuable Player, Michal Sykora as Most Valuable Player and Jamie Black as Most Sportsmanlike Player.

The 1993–94 season marked a year of transition for the Rockets, with the graduation of high-scoring veteran Allan Egeland, solid forward Trever Fraser and goaltender Jeff Calvert. The Rockets' third season also boasted the presence of some of the League's top rookies and a solid base of nine National Hockey League (NHL)-drafted players; six alone were selected in 1994, bringing the total to 13 Rockets drafted in the short span of three seasons. Rockets eventually finished third in the West with a 33–34–5 record.

With a strong finish in the 1993–94 season, the Rockets strove to compete at a higher level of excellence. They began their third season boasting impressive size in defence and the strength of nine NHL prospects. The team also added the skill and talent of one of Europe's top young forwards, Vaclav Varada, who scored 50 points and tied the team's rookie scoring record. Todd MacDonald, a 1993 Florida Panthers draft choice, became the team's top goaltender and was nominated for the position's best in the West award. Veteran Dallas Thompson was named team captain, and the total make-up of the team's roster ultimately propelled the Rockets to a second-place finish in the West.

1995–2004: New ownership 

The 1995–96 season saw significant change to the entire Rockets organization: not only the loss of defenceman Aleksandr Alekseyev and captain Dallas Thompson due to age, but the decision to relocate the Rockets to Kelowna, British Columbia. After long deliberation and consideration for the City of Tacoma and the many dedicated fans who supported the Rockets, the 22,000-seat Tacoma Dome was no longer a long-term viable home for the Rockets. Key dates became more difficult to secure, leaving the Rockets in search of home ice for playoffs at the end of each regular season. No future of change for the poor sightlines in the arena brought the Rockets organization to the conclusion the team needed to be moved. There were several viable choices prospected; however, Kelowna's rich history in hockey and the prospect of a new arena made Kelowna the natural choice. With the Rockets' relocation came the acquisition of talent in the form of future first-round NHL draft pick Kyle McLaren and fifth-round pick Dale Purinton, as well as the hometown players Jason Deleurme, Ronny Grimmard and Trevor Lornson.

2004: Memorial Cup Champions 

Kelowna qualified for three-straight Memorial Cup tournaments in the years 2003, 2004 and 2005. They won the Memorial Cup for the first time in franchise history in 2004, coincidentally the same year they were selected to host the event.

Fans lined up outside Prospera Place for hours to witness the 2–1 victory for Kelowna in the Memorial Cup's championship game. Every game of the tournament was a sell-out, and an enthusiastic host city cheered wildly as their home team claimed their first Memorial Cup victory in franchise history. The Rockets are the first team since the Ottawa 67's in 1999 to win the Cup on home ice, and the victory marked the second time the Cup's host team has gone undefeated in the tournament, the first being when the Kamloops Blazers hosted and went undefeated in 1995.

Justin Keller scored the game-winning goal late in the third period to defeat Quebec Major Junior Hockey League (QMJHL) champion Gatineau Olympiques. Despite numerous chances on both ends of the ice through the first two periods of play, neither team could find the back of the net until the third. With six-and-a-half minutes gone in the third and Gatineau on the power-play, Jean-Michel Daoust slapped a pass to Guillaume Fournier, who tipped the puck past Rocketes goaltender Kelly Guard for his first of the tournament. Less than four minutes later, however, Kelowna tied the game after a rebound from a Brett Palin slap shot went straight to Randall Gelech, who chipped it in past Gatineau goaltender David Tremblay for his third of the tournament. Kelowna had a chance to take the lead just seconds later, but the shot hit the post.

With 13:38 left to play in the period, Justin Keller streaked in from the right side and tucked the puck between the pads of Tremblay, bringing the largest-ever crowd to attend Kelowna's Prospera Place to their feet. After the game, the CHL announced that more than 1.2 million viewers tuned into Rogers Sportsnet and RDS coverage of the championship tournament, including 410,000 for the final game.

Coincidentally, the Rockets also set the WHL record for fewest goals allowed in a season in 2003–04.

2009: Return to the Cup 

For the fourth time in seven years, the Rockets would play in a Memorial Cup tournament, an appearance record only bettered by the New Westminster Bruins' four appearances in four seasons. Prior to the tournament, during the 2009 WHL playoffs, Kelowna captured the Ed Chynoweth Cup with a 4–2 WHL championship series win over the Calgary Hitmen.

With this series win, the Rockets claimed a spot in the 2009 Memorial Cup tournament, which was hosted in Rimouski, Quebec. In the early stages of the tournament, Kelowna had great success, clinching a spot in the Final. Seeking to find their franchise's second cup title in five years, the Rockets, however, could not convert a win, and as a result, the Ontario Hockey League (OHL)'s Windsor Spitfires went on as 2009 Memorial Cup champions.

2015: Return to the Cup 2 

After five years of failing to qualify for the Memorial Cup, the Rockets broke the slump in 2015 after defeating the Brandon Wheat Kings 4–0 in the WHL finals. They went on to record one win and two losses in the tournament, clinching a spot in the tournament semi-finals. The Rockets then routed the Quebec Remparts 9–3 in the semi-finals, setting-up a game against the Oshawa Generals. Kelowna and Oshawa played hard and forced an overtime. Kelowna then lost the game when Anthony Cirelli, only 1 minute 28 seconds into overtime, banged in a rebound from Carlisle against Jackson Whistle.

Team uniforms 

Since 2000, the Rockets' uniforms have featured a logo resembling the legendary Okanagan Lake monster, Ogopogo. Their current third jersey features the monster's head, taken from their shoulder patch design. The team's colours are jaguar teal, athletic red, copper gold, orange sun, black and white. In 2009, their jerseys were slightly modified to fit the Reebok Edge system.

Season-by-season record
Note: GP = Games played, W = Wins, L = Losses, T = Ties, OTL = Overtime losses, Pts = Points, GF = Goals for, GA = Goals against, PIM = Penalties in minutes

WHL Championship history
2002–03: Win, 4–2 vs. Red Deer
2004–05: Win, 4–1 vs. Brandon
2008–09: Win, 4–2 vs. Calgary
2014–15: Win, 4–0 vs. Brandon

Memorial Cup finals history
2004: Win, 2–1 vs. Gatineau
2009: Loss, 1–4 vs. Windsor
2015: Loss, 1–2 vs. Oshawa

Current roster 
Updated January 13, 2023.

 

 
 

 
 

 
 

  

 

|}

NHL alumni 

Cody Almond
Mikael Backlund
Tyson Barrie
Jamie Benn
Karel Betik
Troy Bodie
Madison Bowey
Brett Bulmer
Mitch Callahan
Mike Card
Rourke Chartier
Blake Comeau
Kyle Cumiskey
Leon Draisaitl
Dillon Dube
Alexander Edler
Todd Fedoruk
Vernon Fiddler
Callan Foote
Nolan Foote
Carsen Germyn
Robb Gordon
Josh Gorges
Tyrell Goulbourne
Scott Hannan
Lucas Johansen
D. J. King
Duncan Keith
Chuck Kobasew
Kaedan Korczak
Joel Kwiatkowski
Milan Kytnar
Quintin Laing
Colin Long
Kole Lind
Brett McLean
Brandon McMillan
Nick Merkley
Josh Morrissey
Travis Moen
Tyler Myers
Cam Paddock
Scott Parker
Dale Purinton
Gage Quinney
Richie Regehr
Luke Schenn
Jesse Schultz
Ray Schultz
Damon Severson
Colton Sissons
Sheldon Souray
Nick Tarnasky
Lassi Thomson
Calvin Thurkauf
Carsen Twarynski
Vaclav Varada
Shea Weber
Nolan Yonkman

See also 
 List of ice hockey teams in British Columbia

References

External links 

 Official website of the Kelowna Rockets
 Official website of the Western Hockey League
 Official website of the Canadian Hockey League

Ice hockey teams in British Columbia
Ice hockey clubs established in 1995
Western Hockey League teams
Sport in Kelowna